Sinopah Mountain is located in the Lewis Range, Glacier National Park in the U.S. state of Montana. Sinopah Mountain rises prominently to the west of Two Medicine Lake. Sinopah means, ""kit fox" in Blackfeet, (who) was the Indian wife of Hugh Monroe (Rising Wolf) and daughter of Lone Walker, a powerful Blackfeet chief."

Geology

Like other mountains in Glacier National Park, the peak is composed of sedimentary rock laid down during the Precambrian to Jurassic periods.

Climate
Based on the Köppen climate classification, the peak is located in an alpine subarctic climate zone with long, cold, snowy winters, and cool to warm summers. Temperatures can drop below −10 °F with wind chill factors below −30 °F.

Gallery

See also
 Mountains and mountain ranges of Glacier National Park (U.S.)

References

External links
 Weather forecast: Sinopah Mountain

Sinopah
Sinopah
Lewis Range